Olímpico Esporte Clube, commonly known as Olímpico, is a Brazilian football club based in Itabaianinha, Sergipe state.

History
The club was founded on August 18, 1958. Olímpico de Pirambu won the Campeonato Sergipano Série A2 in 1994.

Achievements

 Campeonato Sergipano Série A2:
 Winners (1): 1994

Stadium
Olímpico Esporte Clube play their home games at Estádio Denison Fontes Souza, nicknamed Souzão. The stadium has a maximum capacity of 2,000 people.

References

Association football clubs established in 1958
Football clubs in Sergipe
1958 establishments in Brazil